The 2016 Invictus Games was the second edition of the Invictus Games.
On 14 July 2015, Prince Harry, Patron of Invictus Games Foundation, announced the 2016 Invictus Games would take place from 8–12 May 2016 at the ESPN Wide World of Sports Complex in Orlando, Florida.

On 28 October 2015, Prince Harry and USA's First Lady Michelle Obama and Second Lady Jill Biden, launched Invictus Games 2016 at Fort Belvoir.

Organising committee

In order to bring Invictus Games to the USA, Military Adaptive Sports Inc. (MASI) was created, and worked to build on the success of the Invictus Games 2014 held in London.

Board Members of Military Adaptive Sports Inc.

 Chairman: Ken Fisher (Chairman and CEO of the Fisher House Foundation)
 Gerry Byrne, PMC’s vice chairman, also on the board of many NPO, including Fisher House, The Bob Woodruff Foundation, and Veterans Advantage.
 Paul W. Bucha, Vietnam War veteran.
 Martin L. Edelman, "of counsel" to Paul Hastings LLP,
 Bronwen Evans, Founding Director and CEO of True Patriot Love Foundation (TPL) of Canada, which has been raising record funds to support military families through its signature Tribute Dinners since its inception in 2009.
 David Fox, retired senior partner of Greenwich Associates
 Michael Haynie, vice chancellor of Syracuse University, responsible for Veteran and Military Affairs.
 Charlie Huebner, vice president of Paralympic development for the U.S. Olympic and Paralympic Foundation (USOPF).
 Raymond W. Kelly
 Donna E. Shalala, President and CEO of the Clinton Foundation.
 Christie Smith, PhD, Deloitte Managing Principal for Consulting in the west region of the United States.
 Jacqueline A. Weiss, General Counsel of Fisher Brothers, responsible for legal affairs.
 Montel Williams

Ken Fisher served as Chairman and CEO for Invictus Games Orlando 2016.

Invited countries
All 14 countries from the 2014 Games were invited back, while Jordan was the only new invitee.

Sporting events

 Archery
 Driving competition
 Indoor rowing
 Paralympic athletics (aka track & field)
 Paralympic swimming
 Paratriathlon
 Powerlifting
 Road cycling/Road para-cycling
 Sitting volleyball
 Wheelchair basketball
 Wheelchair rugby
 Wheelchair tennis

References

Invictus Games
Invictus Games
Invictus Games
Invictus Games
International sports competitions hosted by the United States
Sports competitions in Orlando, Florida
Invictus Games, 2016
Multi-sport events in the United States
Invictus Games
International sports competitions in Florida